In algebraic number theory, the Gras conjecture  relates the p-parts of the Galois eigenspaces of an ideal class group to the group of global units modulo cyclotomic units.

References

Theorems in algebraic number theory
Conjectures that have been proved